West Siberian Krai (Zapadno-Sibirsky Krai) was an early krai of the Russian SFSR, created after the split of the Siberian Krai in 1930. By the 1937 All-Union Census, it had population of 6,433,527.

See also

References

1930 establishments in Russia
1937 disestablishments in Russia
Former administrative units of Russia